The 1940 United States presidential election in Nevada took place on November 5, 1940, as part of the 1940 United States presidential election. State voters chose three representatives, or electors, to the Electoral College, who voted for president and vice president.

Nevada was won by incumbent President Franklin D. Roosevelt (D–New York), running with Secretary Henry A. Wallace, with 60.08% of the popular vote, against Wendell Willkie (R–New York), running with Minority Leader Charles L. McNary, with 39.92% of the popular vote. , this is the last election in which Lyon County and Churchill County voted for a Democratic presidential candidate.

Results

Results by county

See also
United States presidential elections in Nevada

References

Nevada
1940
1940 Nevada elections